Digita ampullai is a moth of the family Erebidae first described by Michael Fibiger in 2008. It is known from Taiwan.

Adults have been found from March to December, probably in several generations.

The wingspan is 9–10 mm. The crosslines are all present. The antemedial and postmedial lines are prominent, black and slightly waved. The terminal line is marked by tight black interveinal spots. The hindwing is blackish brown and without a discal spot.

References

Micronoctuini
Taxa named by Michael Fibiger
Moths described in 2008